This is a list of released Xbox Live enabled games for Windows Phone.

List

See also
Xbox Games Store
Xbox Live Arcade
List of Xbox 360 games
List of Xbox Live Arcade games
List of PlayStation minis games
List of Downloadable PlayStation Portable games

Xbox